Chonburi is a province of Thailand (changwat) located in eastern Thailand. Its capital is also named Chonburi. Neighbouring provinces are (clockwise from north) Chachoengsao, Chanthaburi, and Rayong, while the Bay of Bangkok is to the west. Pattaya, a major tourism destination in Thailand, is located in Chonburi, along with Laem Chabang, the country's primary seaport. The population of the province has grown rapidly and now totals 1.7 million residents, although a large portion of the population is floating or unregistered. The registered population as of 31 December 2018 was 1.535 million.

Toponymy
The Thai word chon ( //) originates from the Sanskrit word   meaning "water", and the word buri ( //) from Sanskrit ;  meaning "town" or "city"; hence the name of the province means "city of water". (This name is retained for one of Mueang Chonburi's subdistricts.) The standard Chinese name for the province is a phonetic rendering of "Chonburi", .

History 
In the reign of King Nangklao, Rama III, Phra Intha-asa, The Governor of Phanat Nikhom I (Princely member of Nakhon Phanom royal family) took many immigrants (Nakhon Phanom Laotians, Named Lao Asa Pak Nam) from Samut Prakan and New Nakhon Phanom Laotians to Phanat Nikhom. The Siamese King at the time allowed them to establish a habitat between Chonburi and Chachoengsao (Named Phanat Nikhom in the present).

Symbols 
The provincial seal shows the hill Khao Sam Muk, on which there is a sala with a statue of the goddess Chao Mae Sahm Muk, who, it is believed, protects seafarers and the local population.

The provincial tree and flower is the New Guinea rosewood (Pterocarpus indicus, called Mai Pradu in Thai).

The provincial motto is "Beautiful beaches, delicious khao lam, sweet sugar cane, delicate basketry products, and buffalo racing."

Geography
The province is on the Bay of Bangkok, the northern end of the Gulf of Thailand. The Khao Khiao mountain range stretches from the northwest to the southeast of the province. The plains of the north were long used for farming. Laem Chabang, between Chonburi and Pattaya, is one of the few deep-water harbours of Thailand.

Wildlife sanctuary
There is one wildlife sanctuary, along with three other wildlife sanctuaries, make up region 2 (Si Racha) of Thailand's protected areas. 
 Khao Khio–Khao Chomphu Wildlife Sanctuary, 

The provincial permanent legal population rose at nearly four per cent annually, from 1,040,865 in 2000 to 1,554,365 in 2010. There is a large floating population of long-term non-Thai residents without permanent status, on a perpetual tourist visa and/or migrant workers (legal or not), as well as heavy, short-term tourist influxes.

Demographics

Religion

According to a 2015 survey, around 97.87% of the population of Chonburi practices Buddhism, followed by Islam with 1.56% and Christianity with 0.60%.

Administrative divisions

Provincial government 
Chonburi province consists of 11 districts (amphoe). These are further subdivided into 92 subdistricts (tambon) and 710 villages (muban).

Local government 
The local governments are overseen by the Pattaya City Special Local Government in Pattaya and the Chonburi Provincial Administrative Organisation (CPOA,  chonburi) throughout Chonburi. The 47 municipalities are split up into two city municipalities (thesaban nakhon), 10 town municipalities (thesaban mueang), and 35 subdistrict municipalities (thesaban tambon). Local communities are also overseen by 50 subdistrict administrative organisations (SAO, ongkan borihan suan tambon).

Transport

Road
The Bangkok-Chonburi-Pattaya Motorway (Hwy 7) is linked with Bangkok's Outer Ring Road (Hwy 9) with another intersection at Si Nakharin and Rama IX Junction.

The Bang Na-Trat Highway (Hwy 34) from Bang Na travels through Bang Phli and crosses the Bang Pakong River into Chonburi. There is a Chonburi bypass that meets Sukhumvit Road (Hwy 3), passing Bang Saen Beach, Bang Phra, Pattaya and Sattahip.

Airports
By road, it is accessed from Sukhumvit Road and Motorway 7 from Bangkok. Chonburi is also served by scheduled flights via U-Tapao International Airport (UTP), which is a 45-minute drive south of the city.

Highways
The main road through Chonburi is Thailand Route 3, also known as Sukhumvit Road. To the northeast, it connects to Bangkok, and to the south, it connects to Rayong province, Chanthaburi province and Trat province. Route 344 leads east to Klaeng (which is also on Route 3). Route 7 runs parallel to Route 3 but bypasses the densely populated coastal area, connecting to the beach resort city of Pattaya.

Rail
The State Railway of Thailand, the national passenger rail system, provides service in the province, with the main station being Chon Buri Railway Station.

Health 
Many hospitals exist in Chonburi, both public and private. Chonburi has one university hospital, Burapha University Hospital. Its main hospital operated by the Ministry of Public Health is Chonburi Hospital. Hospitals operated by other organisations, such as the Thai Red Cross Society's Queen Savang Vadhana Memorial Hospital and the Queen Sirikit Naval Hospital run by the Royal Thai Navy, are also found in the province.

Educational facilities

Universities
Burapha University (BUU)
Kasetsart University Si Racha Campus (KU SRC)
Rajamangala University of Technology Tawan-ok (RMUTTO)
Sripatum University Chonburi Campus (SPU)
Thailand National Sports University (TNSU)
Thammasat University Pattaya Campus (TU)

Colleges
Graduate School of Public Administration, National Institute of Development Administration (GSPA NIDA)
Interior College (IC)
Panyapiwat Institute of Management (PIM)

Human Achievement Index 2017 

Since 2003, the United Nations Development Programme (UNDP) in Thailand has tracked progress on human development at a sub-national level using the Human Achievement Index (HAI), a composite index covering all eight key areas of human development. The National Economic and Social Development Board (NESDB) has taken over this task since 2017.

Tourism 
Some nine million visitors to the province were recorded in 2012, of which 6.1 million were from abroad, 2.2 million of these being Russian.

One major tourist attraction is the Chonburi Buffalo Race (งานประเพณีวิ่งควาย), which takes place in the districts of Ban Bueng and Nong Yai. The animals are dressed outrageously or creatively by owners. Assembled in the courtyard in front of the town hall, the buffaloes partake in racing or physical fitness and fashion contests. The Chonburi Buffalo Race festival started over 100 years ago. Usually, the races will be complemented with booths selling locally-made items, stage performances, games, and beauty contests. The annual Buffalo Race is held around the 11th lunar month, normally in October. It takes seven days and takes place on the field in front of the city and provincial government offices. The highlight of the festival is the buffalo race, which takes place on the last two days. The prize for the first nose past the finish line is a trophy and some money.

Songkran day in Bangsaen (Ko Phra Sai Wan Lai Bangsaen) is a tradition that has been held continuously for over ten years at Bang Saen Beach and Laem Thaen. The event takes place between April 16–17 of each year. The highlight of this event is a contest in which the contestants build a sand Buddha at Bangsaen Beach. In each Buddha sand arch is a decoration. The combination of the sea atmosphere and Thai decorations has helped this become one of the most popular Songkran festivals in Thailand. Other activities also take place, such as meriting alms to monks, bathing Buddha images, pouring water on the elders, traditional sporting events, sea boxing competitions, and oyster sheep competitions. Seafood and local food are often sold, along with other local products as part of One Tambon One Product (OTOP). Well-known artists have also given concerts at the event.

See also 
 Chonburi F.C.
 Sriracha F.C.
 Pattaya United F.C.
 Supreme Chonburi VC

References

External links 

 Provincial administration (Thai)

 
Provinces of Thailand
Gulf of Thailand
Bay of Bangkok